Puerto Rondón is a town and municipality in the Arauca Department, Colombia.

Municipalities of Arauca Department